Plzeň-South District is a district in the Plzeň Region of the Czech Republic. Its capital is the city of Plzeň. The most populated town of the district is Přeštice.

Administrative division
Plzeň-South District is divided into four administrative districts of municipalities with extended competence: Blovice, Nepomuk, Přeštice and Stod.

List of municipalities
Towns are marked in bold and market towns in italics:

Blovice -
Bolkov -
Borovno -
Borovy -
Buková -
Bukovec -
Čečovice -
Černovice -
Chlum -
Chlumčany -
Chlumy -
Chocenice -
Chotěšov -
Čižice -
Čížkov -
Čmelíny -
Dnešice -
Dobřany -
Dolce -
Dolní Lukavice -
Drahkov -
Holýšov -
Honezovice -
Horní Kamenice -
Horní Lukavice -
Horšice -
Hradec -
Hradiště -
Jarov -
Kasejovice -
Kbel -
Klášter -
Kotovice -
Kozlovice -
Kramolín -
Kvíčovice -
Letiny -
Lisov -
Líšina -
Louňová -
Lužany -
Měcholupy -
Merklín -
Mileč -
Milínov -
Míšov -
Mladý Smolivec -
Mohelnice -
Nebílovy -
Nekvasovy -
Nepomuk -
Netunice -
Neuměř -
Neurazy -
Nezdice -
Nezdřev -
Nová Ves -
Nové Mitrovice -
Oplot -
Oselce -
Otěšice -
Polánka -
Prádlo -
Předenice -
Přestavlky -
Přeštice -
Příchovice -
Ptenín -
Radkovice -
Roupov -
Řenče -
Seč -
Sedliště -
Skašov -
Soběkury -
Spálené Poříčí -
Srby -
Štěnovice -
Štichov -
Stod -
Střelice -
Střížovice -
Tojice -
Třebčice -
Týniště -
Únětice -
Útušice -
Ves Touškov -
Vlčí -
Vlčtejn -
Vrčeň -
Všekary -
Vstiš -
Zdemyslice -
Zemětice -
Žákava -
Ždírec -
Žinkovy -
Životice

Geography

The terrain is hilly, most of the territory has the character of highlands. The territory extends into four geomorphological mesoregions: Švihov Highlands (most of the territory), Plasy Uplands (west and northwest), Blatná Uplands (southeast) and Brdy Highlands (northeast).

The territory is rich in watercourses. There are three important rivers that cross the district from south to north: Radbuza, Úhlava and Úslava. There are no significant bodies of water.

Brdy is the protected landscape area that extends into the territory in the east.

Demographics

Most populated municipalities

Economy
The largest employers with its headquarters in Plzeň-South District and at least 500 employers are:

Transport
The D5 motorway (part of the European route E50) from Prague to Plzeň and the Czech-German border briefly passes through the district. The other important roads in the district are the I/27 (part of European route E53) from Plzeň to the Czech-German border via Klatovy, and the I/20 (part of European route E49) from Karlovy Vary to Plzeň and Písek.

Sights

The most important monuments in the district, protected as national cultural monuments, are:
Church of Saint Nicholas in Čečovice
Church of the Assumption of the Virgin Mary in Přeštice
Chotěšov Abbey

The best-preserved settlements, protected as monument zones, are:
Dobřany
Spálené Poříčí
Lipnice
Mítov
Řesanice
Zahrádka

The most visited tourist destination is the Chotěšov Abbey.

Notes

References

External links

Plzeň-South District profile on the Czech Statistical Office's website

 
Districts of the Czech Republic